The FIS Ski Jumping Europa Cup was a series of ski jumping competitions arranged yearly by the International Ski Federation. Prior to the formation of the Continental Cup in 1993, the Europa Cup served as the second level of international ski jumping, ranking below the World Cup. Athletes competing in the Europa Cup were usually juniors and jumpers fighting for a spot on their nation's World Cup team. Often some World Cup athletes would also compete in the Europa Cup inbetween World Cup events.

The International Ski Federation considers the last two Europa Cup seasons in 1991/92 and 1992/93 where they competed only in Europe and with only European ski jumpers, as first two Continental Cup seasons. Starting from the 1993/94 season the Continental Cup was officially started with events in North America and Asia and the Europa Cup was absorbed in the new Continental Cup as a result.

Men's standings

Double wins

References 

 
Europa Cup
Recurring sporting events established in 1980
Jumping